Anna Kilponen (born 16 May 1995) is a Finnish ice hockey defenceman,  signed with the Metropolitan Riveters of the Premier Hockey Federation (PHF) for the 2022–23 season. She played four seasons of college ice hockey in the NCAA Division I, two seasons with the North Dakota Fighting Hawks and two seasons with the Quinnipiac Bobcats. Following her college career, she has played in the Swedish Women's Hockey League (SDHL) with Linköping HC Dam, in the Finnish Naisten Liiga (NSML) with the Tampereen Ilves Naiset, and in the Zhenskaya Hockey League (ZhHL) with the KRS Vanke Rays.

As a member of the Finnish national team, Kilponen won bronze medals at the IIHF Women's World Championship in 2015 and 2017 and represented Finland in the women's ice hockey tournament at the 2014 Winter Olympic Games.

Playing career

Kilponen began her senior career in Naisten SM-sarja, the highest level women's hockey league in Finland, in 2009 with the Tampereen Ilves Naiset. She was named an Ilves alternate captain in the 2010–11 season when she was 15 years old. Kilponen also played with Team Oriflame in the Naisten SM-sarja from the 2011–12 to 2013–14 season and served as team captain for the 2012–13 season. In the 2014–15 season she returned to Ilves and served as captain.

Leading up to the 2015–16 season, Kilponen moved to the United States to attend the University of North Dakota and play NCAA hockey with the North Dakota Fighting Hawks. She played with the Fighting Hawks for two seasons, serving as an alternate captain in 2016–17, until the women's ice hockey program was cut by the university in March 2017. Kilponen then transferred to Quinnipiac University and played for the Quinnipiac Bobcats until graduating in 2019.

Kilponen signed with Linköping HC Dam of the Swedish Women's Hockey League (SDHL) and made her debut with the team in the 2019–20 season. Her one-goal and two assists across the 36-game season marked a career low for Kilponen.

International career
Kilponen was selected for the Finland women's national ice hockey team in the 2014 Winter Olympics. She played in all six games, recording two assists.

As of 2014, Kilponen has also appeared for Finland at two IIHF Women's World Championships. Her first appearance came in 2012.

Kilponen made three appearances for the Finland women's national under-18 ice hockey team, at the IIHF World Women's U18 Championships, with the first in 2011, when she won a bronze medal as part of the team in 2011.

Career statistics

International

Source:

References

External links
 
 Quinnipiac bio
 
 

1995 births
Living people
Finnish expatriate ice hockey players in Russia
Finnish expatriate ice hockey players in Sweden
Finnish expatriate ice hockey players in the United States
Finnish women's ice hockey defencemen
Ice hockey players at the 2014 Winter Olympics
Ilves Naiset players
Linköping HC Dam players
Metropolitan Riveters players
North Dakota Fighting Hawks women's ice hockey players
Olympic ice hockey players of Finland
People from Orivesi
Quinnipiac Bobcats women's ice hockey players
Shenzhen KRS Vanke Rays players
Sportspeople from Pirkanmaa
Team Kuortane players